Jaya Krishna Gummadi (born in Vijayawada, Andhra Pradesh, India) is an Indian cinematographer who has worked in Telugu and Malayalam cinema. Even though he is from same village as that of Gummadi Venkateswara Rao, they are not related. Gummadi has received the National Film Award for Best Non-Feature Film Cinematography at the 56th National Film Awards, for his short film When This Man Dies. His diploma film Vadhakramam won the critics jury award at the Rio de Janeiro International Film Festival.

Background
Gummadi was in 10th class when he got inspired by the spectacular cinematography in Geethanjali in 1989 and that's where his aspiration of being a cinematographer got wings. After getting his Degree in Photography from JNTU, he worked as an assistant to the noted cinematographer Sameer Reddy for 2 years. By 2004, he did Graduation in Motion Picture Photography from Film and Television Institute of India, Pune. As a student at FTII his dialogue film won Kodak Film school competition at the national level for his cinematography.

Telugu cinema
After graduating from FTII, he came back to Hyderabad, to make his debut, as a cinematographer, for the Telugu film, Mr & Mrs Sailaja Krishnamurthy. This was followed by the 2009 Malayalam thriller, Winter, starring Jayaram. In 2007, Okkadunnadu was released. In 2008, he was credit for Idhi Sangathi, starring Tabu and Abbas. The film was noted for being shot on HD (High definition/viper camera). He has also been associated with a couple of short films. The most prominent being 22 Minutes, directed by renowned music director, R.P. Patnaik, and I am Famous, directed by R. Hanumantha Rao.

International honor
In 2010, his significant contribution in Cinematography to a Marathi feature film Vihir won Best Cinematography Award in Asia Pacific Screen Awards, Australia.

Filmography

References 

Telugu film cinematographers
Malayalam film cinematographers
1974 births
Living people
Telugu people
Artists from Vijayawada
Film and Television Institute of India alumni
Best Cinematography National Film Award winners
Cinematographers from Andhra Pradesh
21st-century Indian photographers